Marjorie  Leah Hoshell (January 7, 1918 – April 5, 1989) was an American actress.

Born in Chicago, Hoshelle was the daughter of Norman and Leah Hoshell. She graduated from the Art Institute of Chicago and UCLA.

Portraying Juliet in a stage production of Romeo and Juliet, Hoshelle caught the attention of a talent scout. The resulting screen tests resulted in a Warner Bros. contract. She appeared in the films Princess O'Rourke, Find the Blackmailer, Old Acquaintance, Shine On, Harvest Moon, Make Your Own Bed, The Mask of Dimitrios, The Strange Mr. Gregory, Black Market Babies, The Red Dragon, My Reputation, One More Tomorrow, Behind the Mask, Blonde for a Day, Cloak and Dagger, Bungalow 13, Ladies of the Chorus, Riding High, I Can Get It for You Wholesale and Dangerous Crossing.

In 1946, Hoshelle married actor Jeff Chandler. They had two daughters, and divorced in 1959.

Following her film career, Hoshelle taught acting and directed productions at Santa Monica City College and Los Angeles Harbor College.

Filmography

References

External links
 

1918 births
1989 deaths
20th-century American actresses
American film actresses
Actresses from Chicago